Dmitriyevka is a village in the Ysyk-Ata District of Chüy Region of Kyrgyzstan. Its population was 3,602 in 2021.

References

Populated places in Chüy Region